The ninth season of the talent show The Voice of Germany premiered on September 12, 2019 on ProSieben and on September 15, 2019 on Sat.1. The coaches were the singer and songwriter Mark Forster returning for his third season, while songwriter and singer Rea Garvey, who last coached in the fifth season returned alongside new coaches, pop musician Alice Merton and rapper Sido, who replaced Michi & Smudo, Yvonne Catterfeld and Michael Patrick Kelly. For the first time in its history, the show featured a fifth coach, Nico Santos, who selected contestants to participate in The Voice: Comeback Stage by SEAT. Meanwhile hosts Thore Schölermann returned for his eighth season and Lena Gercke returned for her fifth season.

Claudia Emmanuela Santoso was named the winner of the season on November 10, 2019; making her the third foreigner contestant (first artist born completely outside of Europe) to win in the show's history and Alice Merton became the first female coach to win The Voice of Germany.

Coaches and hosts

On April 7, 2019, it was announced that after 5 years Michi & Smudo would not be returning to the show. On May 6, 2019, it was announced that after 3 years Yvonne Catterfeld would not be returning as a coach, though she confirmed she would remain on The Voice Senior. On May 22, 2019, it was announced that Michael Patrick Kelly would also not be returning as a coach but instead will switch to coach on the second season of The Voice Senior. On May 26, 2019, it was announced that Rea Garvey would be returning for his fifth season after a three-year hiatus, along with new coaches Alice Merton and Sido and returning coach Mark Forster. Therefore, for the first time in the history of The Voice of Germany, there are no duo coaches on the panel. It was announced on August 21, 2019 that Nico Santos would become a fifth coach, mentoring unsuccessful auditioners on an online version in a new round called The Voice: Comeback Stage by SEAT.

Thore Schölermann and Lena Gercke both remained on the show as hosts.

A new round this season, entitled "Comeback Stage by SEAT", saw artists who did not turn a chair in the Blind Auditions as well as eliminated artists from later rounds of the competition, get a second chance to return to the competition for the live shows. The artists remained, mentored by Nico Santos, competed against each other in a digital companion series, with the winners securing a spot in the Live Shows. In addition, the number of finalists were increased from 4 to 5 this season.

Teams

Blind auditions
The auditions for the ninth season took place from February 2019 to March 2019 but not shown on television. The blind auditions were recorded from June 7, 2019 to June 12, 2019 at Studio Adlershof in Berlin and were broadcast from September 12, 2019 until October 10, 2019, being broadcast every Thursday on ProSieben and every Sunday on Sat.1.

Color key

Episode 1 (September 12) 
The first blind audition episode was broadcast on September 12, 2019 on ProSieben.

 Coaches Performance: Alice Merton: "No Roots", Sido: "Tausend Tattoos", Rea Garvey: "Is It Love", Mark Forster: "Chöre"

Episode 2 (September 15) 
The second blind audition episode was broadcast on September 15, 2019 on Sat.1.

Episode 3 (September 19) 
The third blind audition episode was broadcast on September 19, 2019 on ProSieben.

Episode 4 (September 22) 
The fourth blind audition episode was broadcast on September 22, 2019 on Sat.1.

Episode 5 (September 26) 
The fifth blind audition episode was broadcast on September 26, 2019 on ProSieben.

Episode 6 (September 29) 
The sixth blind audition episode was broadcast on September 29, 2019 on Sat.1.

Episode 7 (October 3) 
The seventh blind audition episode was broadcast on October 3, 2019 on ProSieben.

Episode 8 (October 6) 
The eighth blind audition episode was broadcast on October 6, 2019 on Sat.1.

Episode 9 (October 10) 
The ninth and final blind audition episode was broadcast on October 10, 2019 on ProSieben.

Battle rounds
The battle rounds were recorded from August 5, 2019 to August 7, 2019 in Berlin and were broadcast from October 13, 2019 until October 24, 2019, being broadcast like the blind auditions every Thursday on ProSieben and every Sunday on Sat.1.

The coaches can steal one losing artist from other coaches. Contestants who win their battle or are stolen by another coach will advance to the Sing-off. New to this season, is the introduction of the Steal Room. While steals have returned, each artist that is stolen this season will sit in a designated seat in the Steal Room as they watch the other performances. If a coach has stolen one artist but later decides to steal another, the first artist will be replaced and eliminated by the newly-stolen artist.

Color key

  Coach Sido didn't pick a winner, because he thought both artists didn't manage to listen to his instructions.

Sing offs
The sing offs were recorded in Berlin from September 10, 2019 to September 11, 2019 and were broadcast in two episodes on October 27, 2019 on Sat.1 and on October 31, 2019 on ProSieben. This season's advisors were Natasha Bedingfield for Team Mark, Ryan Tedder for Team Alice, James Blunt for Team Sido and Michael Schulte for Team Rea.

The Sing Off determines which two artists from each team will advance to the final round of competition, the Live Shows. In this round, after an artist performs, he or she will sit in one of two hot-seats above the stage. The first two artists performing from each team will sit down, but once the third artist performs, a coach has the choice of replacing the third artist with any artist sitting down or eliminating them immediately. Once all artists have performed, those who remain seated will advance to the Live Shows.

Color key

Comeback Stage
For this season, the show added a brand new phase of competition called The Voice: Comeback Stage by SEAT that was exclusive to thevoiceofgermany.de. It was shown for the first time in the fifteenth season of the American version. After failing to turn a chair in the blind auditions or eliminated from battles and sing offs, artists had the chance to be selected by fifth coach Nico Santos to become a member of his ten-person team. The two winners competed in the Live Shows against the talents of the coaches Alice Merton, Rea Garvey, Sido and Mark Forster live on television for a chance to win the ninth season of The Voice of Germany.

First round
During the first round of competition, the six selected artists from Blind Auditions went head to head, two artists per episode, and Santos selected a winner to move on to the next round.

Second round
In the second round, the three remaining artists chose another song to sing, with two of them advancing to the next round.

Third round
In the third round, Santos brought back two artists who were eliminated during the Battle rounds, giving them a chance to re-enter in the competition. These artists faced off against the two artists from the second round.

Final round
In the final round, the two winners of the third round competed against two eliminated artists from the Sing Offs. From these four artists, two advanced in the Live Shows.

Live shows
The live shows began on November 3, 2019 on Sat.1. Each coach has in his/her team 2 artists.

Week 1: Semi-Final (November 3)
The semi-final aired on November 3, 2019, with two acts from each team performing. The public chose one artist from each team to advance to the final.

Color key

Week 2: Final (November 10)
The final aired on November 10, 2019. In the final week, the five finalists performed a solo cover song, an original duet song with their coach and a duet with a special guest.

Elimination chart 
Coaches color key

Results color key

Overall

Team

Live in Concert
Like the previous seasons, the finalists and a wildcard winner chosen by the audience, went on a concert tour in December across Germany. This tour began on December 6, 2019 and had nineteen stops. The tour featured the top finalists from each team, including Claudia Emmanuela Santoso, Erwin Kintop, Lucas Rieger, Fidi Steinbeck and Freschta Akbarzada and the wildcard winner, Mariel Kirschall.

The tour began on December 6, 2019 in Braunschweig and ended on December 30, 2019 in Bielefeld.

Contestants, who appeared in previous seasons

  Mark Agpas withdrew before the Battle Stage in the eighth season, but Mark Forster gave him a second chance and he advanced to the Battle Stage this season without auditioning.

Ratings

References

External links
 Official website on ProSieben.de
 The Voice of Germany on fernsehserien.de

2019 German television seasons
9